Marua is a settlement in Kenya's Central Province. It is part of the Nyeri Town Constituency.

References 

Populated places in Central Province (Kenya)